Youfangqiao station, known as Wangjiacun station during planning until 2007, is a station on Line 2 and Line S3 of the Nanjing Metro. It started operations on 28 May 2010 along with the rest of Line 2. The interchange with Line S3 opened on 26 December 2017 with the opening of that line.

References

Railway stations in Jiangsu
Railway stations in China opened in 2010
Nanjing Metro stations